The China Railways GJ (工建 Gongjian meaning 'construction worker') locomotives were a class of 122  steam locomotives built for industrial and shunting uses.

History
The locomotives were designed at the Dalian locomotive works and built at the Taiyun and Chengdu works between 1958 and 1961. Many were used at steel works, others were used as pilot locomotives at railway factories. Some units remained in use until the 2000s.

In July 1959, seven class GJ locomotives were sent from the Chengdu Works to the Korean State Railway of North Korea.

Preservation
GJ-1018(Taiyuan version) is preserved in a park near Sujiatun Locomotive Works.
GJ-1019(Taiyuan version) is part of the Beijing Railway Museum collection.
GJ-1038 is preserved in Shenyang Railway Museum.
GJ-1045 is preserved in Jijie Railway Station, Gejiu, Yunan.
GJ-1076 is preserved in Wafangdian, Liaoning by Fan Yongjun.

In fiction 
The new Thomas & Friends character Hong-Mei is based on the locomotive.

References

External links

Steam locomotives of China
Steam locomotives of Vietnam
0-6-0T locomotives
Standard gauge locomotives of China
Standard gauge locomotives of Vietnam
Railway locomotives introduced in 1958
Shunting locomotives